Solar power station may refer to:

Concentrated solar power
Photovoltaic power station
Space-based solar power

See also
List of solar thermal power stations
List of photovoltaic power stations